John Thompson Guice (5 November 1923 – 1 October 2001) was a senior United States Air Force officer who served as the Director of the Air National Guard from February 1977 to April 1981.

He completed pilot training in May 1944, and graduated from the United States Military Academy at West Point in 1947. He was a graduate of Air War College Commemorative History class of 1966. In 1972, Guice was assigned as executive of the National Guard Bureau, moving up to deputy director of the Air National Guard in 1974 and director in 1977.

Notes and references

External links
 
 

1923 births
2001 deaths
National Guard (United States) generals
Recipients of the Air Force Distinguished Service Medal
Recipients of the Legion of Merit
Recipients of the Order of the Sword (United States)
United States Air Force generals
United States Air National Guard
United States Military Academy alumni